The Mazzeo system is a key system for the clarinet invented by Rosario Mazzeo in the 1950s, and is a modification of the Boehm system.  Exclusive mass-production rights were given to the Selmer company, although only 13,000 were made. Many are now in museums, but some are in private collections or can be found for sale. In addition to the instruments made in France, Selmer's "Bundy" and "Signet" lines of student instruments (made in the U.S.A.) each included a Mazzeo model.

The differences between a Boehm system clarinet and a Mazzeo system clarinet are

The throat B using the A key and any one or combination of left-hand second or third finger or right-hand first, second, or third fingers to operate a linkage opening the third right-index-finger trill key, rather than using the inadequately vented register key to obtain that pitch; the same fingerings, minus A key, produce A; traditional (Boehm) B and A fingerings are also available;
A left-hand-thumb plateau key;
A ringless bell with less flare.

Full and modified Mazzeo clarinets feature

An E/B key playable with the thumb, first, and third fingers and D/A key on the left-hand side;
An articulated B to C keys;
An alternate left-hand A/E key.

References

External links
Mazzeo System Clarinets at the National Music Museum
MFA Boston: Clarinets, Saxophones and Related Musical Instruments

Clarinet systems